Arent Passer (c. 1560 – 1637) was a stonemason and architect of Dutch origin. He was born in The Hague and worked in Tallinn from 1589 until his death. Arent Passer is buried in St. Olaf's church in Tallinn.

Best known artwork by Arent Passer is the tomb chest of the Swedish Commander-in Chief Pontus De La Gardie and his wife baroness Sofia Johansdotter Gyllenhielm in the Dome Church, made in 1595.

References

External links

1560s births
1637 deaths
Estonian architects
History of Tallinn
Architects from The Hague
16th-century architects
17th-century architects